Inés Margraff (born 17 January 1958) is an Ecuadorian sports shooter. She competed in the women's 10 metre air pistol event at the 1988 Summer Olympics.

References

External links
 

1958 births
Living people
Ecuadorian female sport shooters
Olympic shooters of Ecuador
Shooters at the 1988 Summer Olympics
Place of birth missing (living people)
21st-century Ecuadorian women